Estadio Municipal Doctor Mario Sobrero is a multi-use stadium in Rocha, Uruguay.  It is currently used primarily for football matches.  The stadium holds 8,000 people and was built in 1955. It is the home stadium of Rocha F.C.

References

Sports venues completed in 1955
Municipal Doctor Mario Sobrero
Municipal Doctor Mario Sobrero
Buildings and structures in Rocha Department
1955 establishments in Uruguay
Sport in Rocha Department